Matthew Lombardi (born March 18, 1982) is a Canadian former professional ice hockey center who played in the National Hockey League (NHL) for the Calgary Flames, Phoenix Coyotes, Nashville Predators, Toronto Maple Leafs and Anaheim Ducks.

Playing career
Lombardi was born and raised in Hudson, Quebec, a suburb of Montreal, Quebec. As a youth, he played in the 1995 Quebec International Pee-Wee Hockey Tournament with the Lac-Saint-Louis-Ouest minor ice hockey team. He later played hockey for the LaPresqu'ile minor hockey association before playing junior ice hockey for the Victoriaville Tigres in the Quebec Major Junior Hockey League (QMJHL) for four years before.

Lombardi was selected in the 2000 NHL Entry Draft 215th overall by the Edmonton Oilers. Lombardi failed to sign with the Oilers, re-entering the draft where he was picked 90th overall by the Calgary Flames in the 2002 NHL Entry Draft. His style of play is one of speed and agility, often leading the rush with his great speed and finesse.

Lombardi played in the 2004 Stanley Cup Playoffs, during which he suffered a vicious elbow to the head from Red Wings defenceman Derian Hatcher and was unable to play for several months. The Flames eventually lost to the Tampa Bay Lightning in Game Seven of the Stanley Cup Finals. During the locked-out 2004–05 season, he played for the Flames affiliate Lowell Lock Monsters in the American Hockey League (AHL), after he recovered fully from the elbow, returning to the NHL and the Flames when the league resumed play in 2005–06.

He was a member of the 2007 Canadian IIHF World Championship team that won gold in a 4–2 win against Finland in Moscow. During the tournament he scored six goals and had six assists for 12 points, and led Canada for most points.

On March 4, 2009, he was traded along with Brandon Prust and a first-round draft pick to the Phoenix Coyotes in exchange for Olli Jokinen.

On February 8, 2010, he recorded a five-point night in a 6–1 win over the Edmonton Oilers.

On July 2, 2010 he signed a three-year contract with the Nashville Predators. In the first year of the contract Lombardi played only two games, due to a concussion suffered during the first period of an October 13 game against the Chicago Blackhawks.

Due to internal cap restrictions on July 3, 2011, he was traded along with Cody Franson by the Predators to the Toronto Maple Leafs for Brett Lebda and Robert Slaney. In the 2011-12 season, on October 6, 2011, he made his return from concussion and played in his first game as a member of the Toronto Maple Leafs, scoring the game-winning goal against the Montreal Canadiens.

Prior to the lockout shortened 2012–13 season, he was traded by the Leafs back to the Phoenix Coyotes for a conditional draft pick on January 16, 2013. Again missing time due to injury and failing to recapture his previous scoring presence with the Coyotes, Lombardi was again on the move at the trade deadline when he was dealt to the Anaheim Ducks in exchange for Brandon McMillan on April 3, 2013.

On August 29, 2013, he signed his first contract abroad on a one-year deal with Swiss club, Genève-Servette HC of the National League A. In the 2013–14 season with Geneva, Lombardi regained his scoring touch, to lead the league with 30 assists and 50 points in only 46 games.

On July 16, 2014 Lombardi returned to the NHL after gaining interest from the New York Rangers, signing a two-year deal worth $1.6 million.  Lombardi failed to make the team out of training camp and was assigned to the Hartford Wolf Pack, the team's AHL affiliate, after clearing waivers.  Lombardi refused to report to the Wolf Pack and was released by the organization after passing unconditional waivers.

On October 13, 2014, Genève-Servette, the team where Lombardi had played for the 2013–14 season, announced that he would be re-joining their team for the 2014–15 season.

After playing 15 professional seasons, Lombardi made his retirement official on November 24, 2016.

Career statistics

Regular season and playoffs

International

References

External links

Matthew Lombardi Minor Hockey Goal Mix Video
Lombardi's page at sports.yahoo.com
Lombardi's page at sportsillustrated.cnn.com
Lombardi's page at sportsline.com

1982 births
Living people
Anaheim Ducks players
Anglophone Quebec people
Calgary Flames draft picks
Calgary Flames players
Canadian ice hockey centres
Canadian people of Italian descent
Edmonton Oilers draft picks
Gatineau Olympiques players
Genève-Servette HC players
Ice hockey people from Montreal
Lowell Lock Monsters players
Nashville Predators players
Omaha Ak-Sar-Ben Knights players
Phoenix Coyotes players
Saint John Flames players
Toronto Maple Leafs players
Victoriaville Tigres players
Canadian expatriate ice hockey players in Switzerland